The Israel women's national water polo team represents Israel in international women's water polo competitions and friendly matches.

World Championship record
2023 – Qualified

European Championship record
2018 – 10th place
2020 – 9th place
2022 – 6th place

Current squad
Roster for the 2020 Women's European Water Polo Championship.

Head coach: Dimitrios Mavrotas

Under-20 team
Israel made its debut at the 2021 FINA Junior Water Polo World Championships.

References

External links

Women's national water polo teams
National water polo teams in Europe
National water polo teams by country
Water polo